Samu is a chiefdom in Kambia District of Sierra Leone with a population of 56,857. Its principal town is Kychum.

References

Chiefdoms of Sierra Leone
Northern Province, Sierra Leone